Carex johnstonii is a tussock-forming species of perennial sedge in the family Cyperaceae. It is native to parts of central and eastern Africa.

The species was first formally described by the botanist Johann Otto Boeckeler in 1886 as a part of the work Botanische Jahrbücher für Systematik, Pflanzengeschichte und Pflanzengeographie.

See also
List of Carex species

References

johnstonii
Taxa named by Johann Otto Boeckeler
Plants described in 1886
Flora of the Democratic Republic of the Congo
Flora of Uganda
Flora of Kenya
Flora of Ethiopia
Flora of Tanzania
Flora of Rwanda
Flora of Sudan